Without Warning! is a 1952 American film noir crime film directed by Arnold Laven and starring Adam Williams, Meg Randall, and Ed Binns.  The film is shot in a semidocumentary-style with police procedural voice-over narration in parts.  Without Warning! was released commercially for the first time on DVD in 2005.  Previously, the film was considered lost and unavailable for viewings.

Plot

A quiet gardener living in Los Angeles, California picks up blond women and is murdering them with garden shears.  The police attempt to track him down but the man continues to kill.  The killer lives in a shack on a hill overlooking Los Angeles (Chavez Ravine).

Cast
 Adam Williams as Carl Martin
 Meg Randall as Jane Saunders
 Ed Binns as Lt. Pete Hamilton
 Harlan Warde as Police Detective Sgt. Don Warde
 John Maxwell as Fred Saunders
 Angela Stevens as Janet Collier (Blonde)
 Byron Kane as Police Chemist Charlie Wilkins
 Charles Tannen as Wolf
 Marilee Phelps as Virginia
 Robert Foulk as Wilson, Motel Manager
 Connie Vera as Carmelita
 Robert Shayne as Dr. Werner, Police Psychiatrist
 Lee Phelps as "Doc," the Police Coroner
 Arthur Gardner (movie's co-producer) as Jackson, Rapid Transit Cab Co. Driver

Production
It was the first team from Laven, Gardner and Levy who met in the army. Sol Lesser liked the film and picked it up for distribution.

Release

Home media
Without Warning! was released for the first time on DVD by MPI Home Video on August 30, 2005.

Reception

TV Guide rated the film two out of five stars, calling it "A capable first feature by the production team, with talented unknowns as actors".

References

External links
 
 
 
 

1952 films
1950s crime thriller films
American black-and-white films
American police detective films
Film noir
Films directed by Arnold Laven
Films scored by Herschel Burke Gilbert
Films set in Los Angeles
United Artists films
1952 directorial debut films
American crime thriller films
1950s English-language films
1950s American films
Rediscovered American films
1950s rediscovered films